"Let the Happiness In" is a song by the English singer-songwriter David Sylvian. It is the first single from his album Secrets of the Beehive.

The instrumental B-side "Blue of Noon" was an unfinished out-take recorded during the Brilliant Trees sessions.

Formats and track listing 
All songs written by David Sylvian
European 7" single (VS 1001)
"Let The Happiness In" – 5:30
"Blue Of Noon" – 5:39

European 12" single (VST 1001)
"Let The Happiness In" – 5:30
"Blue Of Noon" – 5:39
"Buoy (remix)" – 5:54

B-Sides

Credits 'Blue of Noon':
Ryuichi Sakamoto: piano, synths
Wayne Braithwaite: double bass
Steve Jansen: drums
Produced by David Sylvian and Steve Nye
Mixed by Nigel Walker.

David Sylvian said about the track: "Blue of Noon was never a finished piece as far as I was concerned (it was originally a song in fact). I felt it needed work to help it stand on its own feet."

Steve Jansen said about the track: 
"Yes it was recorded in Berlin during Brilliant Trees sessions. It was a live recording, we played the track a number of times and this was the best take. Wayne (bass) may have dropped in for a line here or there once the drums and piano were recorded."

Credits 'Buoy (Remix)':

Written by Mick Karn, Original version taken from Mick Karn's solo album Dreams of Reason Produce Monsters, released in 1987.

Mick Karn: bass, saxophone, dida, synthesiser, backing vocals 
Steve Jansen: drums, synthesiser, backing vocals
David Sylvian: vocals 
Produced by Karn and Jansen
Remix by Sylvian and Nigel Walker

Chart positions

References

1987 singles
David Sylvian songs
Songs written by David Sylvian